Amelia Shankley is a British actress (born 18 June 1972)

Career
Shankley is known for her role as the young Alice Liddell in the film Dreamchild (1985), from a script by Dennis Potter, and Sara Crewe in the LWT version of A Little Princess (1986), based upon the novel A Little Princess by Frances Hodgson Burnett. Shankley also portrayed Vicki Lovejoy in seasons two and three of the television series Lovejoy.

Filmography

Awards
Winner:
1986 Paris Film Festival - Best Actress, Dreamchild

Nominated:
1986: Saturn Award for Best Performance by a Younger Actor - Dreamchild

External links

1972 births
English television actresses
English child actresses
English voice actresses
Living people
English film actresses